The Saxifragales (saxifrages) are an order of flowering plants (Angiosperms). They are an extremely diverse group of plants which include trees, shrubs, perennial herbs, succulent and aquatic plants. The degree of diversity in terms of vegetative and floral features makes it difficult to define common features that unify the order.

In the Angiosperm Phylogeny Group classification system, the Saxifragales are placed within the major division  of flowering plants referred to as eudicots, specifically the core eudicots. This subgroup consists of the Dilleniaceae, superasterids and superrosids. The superrosids in turn have two components, rosids and Saxifragales. The Saxifragales order has undergone considerable revision since its original classification based purely on plant characteristics. The modern classification is based on genetic studies using molecular phylogenetics. There is an extensive fossil record from the Turonian-Campanian (late Cretaceous) time, about 90 million years ago (Myr). However, molecular studies suggest an earlier origin in the early Cretaceous (102–108 Myr) with rapid early diversification to more modern forms.

The order Saxifragales consists of 15 families, about 100 genera and 2,470 species. Of the 15 families, many are small, with 8 having only a single genus, the largest family being the Crassulaceae (stonecrops) with about 35 genera. Saxifragales are found worldwide, though rarely in the tropics, and in a wide variety of habitats from desert to aquatic. They also have a wide variety of uses, from timber to foodstuffs and ornamental plants. Apart from ornamentals, the major economically important group is the Grossulariaceae (currants and gooseberries), particularly blackcurrant.

Description 

The order Saxifragales is extremely morphologically diverse (hyper-diverse). It includes trees (e.g. witch hazel, witch alder in Hamamelidaceae), fruit bearing shrubs (e.g. currants, gooseberries in Grossulariaceae), lianas, annual and perennial herbs, rock garden plants (e.g. saxifrage in Saxifragaceae), ornamental garden plants (e.g. peonies in Paeoniaceae), succulents (e.g. stonecrop in Crassulaceae) and aquatics (e.g. watermilfoil in Haloragaceae). The flowers demonstrate major variations in sepal, petal, stamen, and  carpel number,  as well as ovary position (see Biogeography and evolution).

This degree of diversity makes defining synapomorphy (derived common characteristics) for the group extremely difficult, the order being defined on the basis of molecular affinity rather than morphology. However, some characteristics that are prevalent (common traits) represent potential or putative synapomorphies based on ancestral states. These include flowers that are usually radially symmetric and petals that are free. The gynoecium (female reproductive part) generally consists of two carpels (ovary, style and stigma) that are free, at least toward the apex (partially fused bicarpellate gynoecium) and possess a hypanthium (cup shaped basal floral tube). In the androecium (male reproductive part), the stamen anthers are generally basifixed (attached at its base to the filament), sometimes dorsifixed (attached at centre) (see  Figure 2). Other commonly occurring features are fruit that is generally follicular (formed from a single carpel), seeds with abundant endosperm surrounding the embryo and leaves with glandular teeth at their margins (glandular dentate, see image). Within the Saxifragales, while the families of the woody clade are primarily woody, the primarily herbaceous families of  Crassulaceae and Saxifragaceae exhibit woody features as a secondary transition.

Taxonomy 

Saxifragales is a relatively small angiosperm order, having only 15 families, about 100 genera and about 2,470 species.

History 

Saxifragales was first described in 1820 by Berchtold and Presl in 1820 as a group of plants, Saxifrageae, with five genera, including Saxifraga, lending their names as the botanical authority (Bercht. & J.Presl). At times, that authority has also been given to Dumortier, due to a later publication (1829). Dumortier first used the word Saxifragaceae. By the time of John Lindley's The Vegetable Kingdom (1853), the term Saxifragales was in use, which Lindley called an Alliance, containing five families. Later, the Saxifragales were placed in the angiosperm class Dicotyledons, also called Magnoliopsida.

Phylogeny 

The order Saxifragales has undergone considerable revision in both placement and composition, since the use of molecular phylogenetics, and the use of the modern Angiosperm Phylogeny Group (APG) classification. They are identified as a strongly monophyletic group.

In the initial APG publication (1998), the Saxifragales were identified within the core eudicots clade but its relationship to other clades was uncertain. The core eudicots consist of the order Gunnerales and a large clade of Pentapetalae (so named for having a synapomorphy of pentamerous (5 part) perianths), the latter representing about 70% of all angiosperms, with eight major lineages. Later (2003), the order was described as "one of the major surprises  of  molecular  phylogenetic  analyses  of  the angiosperms", having elements previously placed in three or four separate subclasses based on morphology. This was eventually resolved in the third APG system (2009) placing Saxifragales as a sister group to the rosids (Rosidae), within the Pentapetalae clade. This large combination has subsequently been given the name superrosids (Superrosidae), representing part of an early diversification of the angiosperms. Among the rosids, they share a number of similarities with the Rosales, particularly Rosaceae, including a hypanthium, five part flowers and free floral parts. As circumscribed, Saxifragales account for 1.3% of eudicot diversity.

Biogeography and evolution 

Diversification among Saxifragales was rapid, with the extensive fossil record indicating that the order was more diverse and more widespread than an examination of the extant members suggests, with considerable phenotypic diversity occurring early. The earliest fossil evidence is found in the Turonian-Campanian (late Cretaceous), suggesting a minimum age of 89.5 Myr. However, molecular divergence time estimation suggest an earlier time of 102–108 Myr, into the early Cretaceous, for the crown and stem groups respectively. Within the order Saxifragales, the molecular data imply a very rapid initial diversification time of about 6–8 Myr, between 112 and 120 Myr, with major lineages appearing within 3–6 Myr.

The ancestral state appears to be woody, as in Peridiscaceae and the woody clade, but is also ancestral to Grossulariaceae. A number of independent transitions to a herbaceous habit occurred in the ancestors of Crassulaceae, Saxifragaceae and the base of the Haloragaceae-Penthoraceae clade (the other two families in Haloragaceae s.l. remaining woody), while other taxa reverted to a woody habit, especially Crassulaceae. Most of Saxifragales have a superior ovary, but some families show frequent transition with inferior or subinferior position, particularly Saxifragaceae and to a lesser extent Hamamelidaceae. Almost all Grossulariaceae have an inferior ovary. The ancestral carpel number is two, with transition to higher numbers, such as four in Haloragaceae s.l. and Peridiscaceae with five in Penthoraceae. The ancestral carpel number for Crassulaceae is five, decreasing to four in Kalanchoe, where it is synapomorphic for the genus, though the most frequent transition in this family is 6–10, but only where stamen number is increased above five. Some Macaronesian taxa (Aeonieae) have 8–12, with up to 32 carpels for Aeonium.

The ancestral petal number is five, with three major transitions; 5 to 0, 5 to 4, 5 to 6–10. Increased petal number is seen in Paeoniaceae and Crassulaceae, particularly where stamen number is also increased. Cercidiphyllum + Daphniphyllum, Chrysosplenium and Altingia are examples of the complete loss of petals. The ancestral stamen:petal ratio is 1, with transitions characterising several clades, e.g. Paeonicaceae+woody clade >2, Crassulaceae 2 (but Crassula 1). Overall there has been a decrease over evolution, but independent of a decrease in petal number, so that it is the stamen number that has decreased. The ancestral habitat appears to be forests, followed by early diversification into desert and aquatic habitats, with shrubland the most recent colonization.

Species diversification was rapid following a transition from a warmer, wetter Earth in the Eocene (56–40 Myr) to early Miocene (23–16 Myr), to the cooler drier conditions of the mid-Miocene (16–12 Myr). However, this appears to not have coincided with ecological and phenotypic evolution, which are themselves correlated. There is a clear lag, whereby increase in species diversification was followed later by increases in niche and phenotypic lability.

Subdivision 

The first APG classification (1998) placed 13 families within the order Saxifragales: 

 Altingiaceae 
 Cercidiphyllaceae 
 Crassulaceae 
 Daphniphyllaceae
 Grossulariaceae
 Haloragaceae
 Hamamelidaceae
 Iteaceae
 Paeoniaceae
 Penthoraceae
 Pterostemonaceae
 Saxifragaceae
 Tetracarpaeaceae

This was subsequently revised to 15, in the fourth version (2016). The Saxifragales families have been grouped into a number of informally named suprafamilial subclades, with the exception of the basal split of Peridiscaceae, which thus forms a sister group with the rest of Saxifragales. The two major ones are (Paeoniaceae + the woody clade of primarily woody families) and the "core" Saxifragales (i.e. the primarily herbaceous families), with the latter subdivided into two further subclades, (Haloragaceae sensu lato + Crassulaceae) and the Saxifragaceae alliance.

In the clade Haloragaceae sensu lato (s.l.) + Crassulaceae the genera constituting Haloragaceae s.l. are all small, and APG II (2003) proposed merging them into a single larger Haloragaceae s.l., but transferred Aphanopetalum from Cunoniaceae to this group. The Saxifragaceae alliance represents Saxifragaceae together with a number of woody members of the traditional Saxifragaceae sensu Engler (1930). Within this, APG II (2003) proposed placing the two species of Pterostemon that constitute Pterostemonaceae within Iteaceae, and all subsequent versions have maintained this practice. Thus Saxifragales sensu APG II consisted of only 10 families. The third version (2009) added Peridiscaceae (from Malpighiales), as sister to all other families, but re-expanded Haloragaceae to provide for a narrower circumscription, Haloragaceae sensu stricto (s.s.), to give a total of 14 families. APG IV (2016) added the parasitic family Cynomoriaceae to provide a total of 15 families, although its placement within the order remained unclear.

Of the 15 families included in APG IV, the basal divergence Peridiscaceae underwent radical shifting and recircumscription from 2003 to 2009. Originally, it consisted of two closely related genera, Peridiscus and Whittonia. The APG II system placed the family in Malpighiales, based on a DNA sequence for the rbcL gene from Whittonia. This sequence turned out to be not from Whittonia, but from other plants whose DNA had contaminated the sample. After placement in Saxifragales, it was expanded to include Soyauxia in 2007, and Medusandra in 2009.

In the first of the subclades of the remaining Saxifragales, Paeoniaceae possesses many unique features and its taxonomic position was controversial for a long time, and Paeonia was placed in Ranunculales, close to Glaucidium, prior to transfer to Saxifragales as sister to the woody clade.

In the woody clade, the genus Liquidambar was included in Hamamelidaceae until molecular phylogenetic studies showed that its inclusion might make Hamamelidaceae paraphyletic, and was segregated as a separate monotypic family, Altingiaceae in 2008. Cercidiphyllaceae was for a long time associated with Hamamelidaceae and Trochodendraceae and was often thought to be closer to the latter, which is now in the basal eudicot order Trochodendrales. Daphniphyllum was always thought to have an anomalous combination of characters and was placed in several different orders before molecular phylogenetic analysis showed it to belong to Saxifragales.

In the core Saxifragales, Crassulaceae and Tetracarpaeaceae have been associated with Saxifragaceae, while Penthorum has been associated both with Crassulaceae and Saxifragaceae, before being placed here. Aphanopetalum was often placed in Cunoniaceae, a family in Oxalidales, even though there were good reasons to put it in Saxifragales, and it was subsequently transferred. Haloragaceae was included in Myrtales, before being placed in Saxifragales.

The other "core" group, the Saxifragaceae alliance comprises four families: Pterostemonaceae, Iteaceae, Grossulariaceae, and Saxifragaceae, which have long been known to be related to each other, but the circumscription of Saxifragaceae has been much reduced and Pterostemonaceae submerged as Pterostemon in Iteaceae.

Most of the families are monogeneric. Choristylis is now considered a synonym of Itea, but the addition of Pterostemon, gives Iteaceae two genera. Liquidambar and Semiliquidambar are also submerged into Altingia, making Altingiaceae monogeneric. About 95% of the species are in five families: Crassulaceae (1400), Saxifragaceae  (500), Grossulariaceae (150–200), Haloragaceae (150), and Hamamelidaceae (100).

The relationships of the Saxifragales families to each other is shown in the following cladogram. The phylogeny in this cladogram still has some uncertainty as to the exact relationships, and the phylogenetic tree is subject to further revision. Cynomoriaceae, previously placed in Santales or Rosales is included in Saxifragales, but unplaced within it. Li et al. (2019) have slightly different relationships, and also place Cynomoriaceae as the first branch in the Crassulaceae+Haloragaceae s.l. tree, i.e. as sister to those two families. The number of genera in each family is shown in parentheses:

Families

Distribution and habitat 

Saxifragales are found worldwide, though primarily in temperate zones and rarely in the tropics. They occupy a wide variety of habitats from arid desert (Crassulaceae) to aquatic conditions (Haloragaceae), with 6 families, including North American species, that are obligate aquatic (fully dependent on an aquatic environment), and including forests, grasslands and tundra. Saxifragales exceeds all other comparably sized clades in terms of diversity of habitats. Most of the diversity occurs in temperate (including montane and arid) conditions that expanded globally during cooling and drying trends in the last 15 My.

The most common habitats are forests and cliffs, with about 300 species occupying each, but with forests being the most diverse phenotypically, where nearly all families are represented. In contrast desert and tundra, with only two families each, contain only about 10% of species. About 90% of species can be assigned to a single habitat.

Conservation 

Whittonia (Peridiscaceae) is thought to be extinct.  the IUCN lists 9 critically endangered, 12 endangered, 19 vulnerable and 7 near threatened species. Among the most threatened Saxifragales are Aichryson dumosum and Monanthes wildpretii (Crassulaceae), Haloragis stokesii and Myriophyllum axilliflorum (Haloragaceae), Ribes malvifolium and R. sardoum (Grossulariaceae), Saxifraga artvinensis (Saxifragaceae) and Molinadendron hondurense (Hamamelidaceae).

Uses 

Plants in the order Saxifragales have found a wide variety of uses, including traditional medicines, ornamental, household, aquarium, pond and garden plants, spices, foodstuffs (fruit and greens), dyestuffs, smoking, resin, timber and roof coverings (see Families).

Cultivation 

A number of Saxifragales genera are commercially cultivated. Paeonia are cultivated both as ornamental shrubs (generally sold as root stock) and for cut flowers, with the Netherlands representing the largest production, other more minor producers are Israel, New Zealand, Chile and the United States. Liquidambar is used for hardwood, with the American Sweetgum (Liquidambar styraciflua) being among the most important sources of commercial hardwood in the Southeast United States, with one of its uses being veneer for plywood. Hamamelis is cultivated in New England for distilleries extracting witch-hazel, widely used in skincare, and is the largest source of this medicament in the world. Among the Crassulaceae, economic importance is limited to horticulture, with many species and cultivars important as ornamentals, including Crassula ovata (jade plant) and Jovibarba (hen and chicken). Hylotelphium, Phedimus, Sedum and Sempervivum are cultivated for rock gardens and for "green roofs". In particular, cultivars of the Madagascan Kalanchoe blossfeldiana, e.g. 'Florists kalanchoe' have achieved commercial success throughout the world, being popular Christmas decorative plants. The Haloragaceae aquatic genus Myriophyllum and the closely related Proserpinaca are cultivated for the commercial aquarium trade. Myriophyllum is also economically important for purification of water and as feed for pigs, ducks, and fish, and polishing wood. 

A number of Ribes (Grossulariaceae) are in commercial production, concentrated in Europe and the USSR from species native to those areas. R. nigrum (blackcurrant) was first cultivated in monastery gardens in Russia in the 11th century, and currant cultivation more generally later in Western Europe, R. uva-crispa (gooseberry)  production began around 1700. The first colonists in N America began cultivating currants in the late 1700s. R. nigrum is the most important commercial currant crop, being produced in more than 23 countries, with the major centres being Russia (more than 63 thousand hectares), Poland, Germany, Scandinavia and the UK. An important source of Vitamin C, black currants are used in the manufacture of jam, fruit jelly, compote, syrup, juice and other drinks, including the cordial Ribena and the liqueur Cassis. Other commercial crops include R. rubrum (red currant). World Ribes crop production was over 750,000 tons in 2002, of which about 150,000 tons were gooseberries, and the largest group blackcurrants.

See also 
 List of Saxifragales families

Notes

References

Bibliography

Books 

 
 
 
 
 
 
 
 
 
 
 
 
 
 
 
 
 

Chapters
 
 
  (full text at ResearchGate)
 
 
 
 
 
 

Historical

Articles 

  
 

Angiosperms
 
 
 
 
 

Eudicots
 
 
 
 

Saxifragales

APG

Saxifragales families

Paleontology

Websites 

 
 
 
  (see also Angiosperm Phylogeny Website)
 
 
 , see also IUCN Red List
 , in Flora of China online vol. 13
 
 

Images

External links
 
 

 
Angiosperm orders
Taxa named by Friedrich von Berchtold
Taxa named by Jan Svatopluk Presl

hu:Kőtörőfüvek